Strungk is a surname of German origin. Notable people with the surname include:

 Delphin Strungk (1600 or 1601–1694), German composer and organist
 Nicolaus Adam Strungk (1640-1700), German composer and violinist

See also
 
 Strunk

Surnames of German origin